Columbellidae incertae sedis mariato is a species of sea snail, a marine gastropod mollusk in the family Columbellidae.

Description

Distribution

References

External links
 Pilsbry, H.A. & Lowe, H.N. (1932). West Mexican and Central American mollusks collected by H. N. Lowe, 1929–1931. Proceedings of the Academy of Natural Sciences of Philadelphia. 84: 33-144, 17 pls
 Fedosov, A. E.; Malcolm, G.; Terryn, Y.; Gorson, J.; Modica, M. V.; Holford, M.; Puillandre, N. (2020). Phylogenetic classification of the family Terebridae (Neogastropoda: Conoidea). Journal of Molluscan Studies

Columbellidae
Gastropods described in 1932